The Upper Similkameen Indian Band or Upper Smelqmix, is a First Nations band government in the Canadian province of British Columbia, whose head offices are located in town of Hedley in the Similkameen Country.  They are a member of the Okanagan Nation Alliance.

Population
The band's registered population in 2006 was 89, 20 of whom live off-reserve.  Most of the band live on Chuchuwayha Indian Reserve No. 2.

Indian reserves

Indian reserves under the band's jurisdiction are:
Chuchuwayha Indian Reserve No. 2, on the Similkameen River at the mouth of Hedley Creek, adjacent to the town of Hedley, 2277.10 ha. 
Chuchuwayha Indian Reserve No. 2C, at the headwaters of Johns Creek, 4 miles southwest of Hedley, 121.40 ha. 
Iltcoola Indian Reserve No. 7, between Hedley and Princeton just west of Bromley Rock Protected Area, 17.40 ha. 
Lulu Indian Reserve No. 5, on left bank of Similkameen River at the mouth of Arcat Creek, 13 miles east of Princeton, adjacent to Bromley Rock Protected Area, 20.20 ha. 
Nine Mile Creek Indian Reserve No. 4, on left bank of the Similkameen River at the mouth of Steven Creek, 80.10 ha. 
One Mile Indian Reserve No. 6, on west side of the Princeton-Merritt Road 10 miles north of Princeton, 4 ha. 
Vermilion Forks Indian Reserve No. 1, on the right bank of the Similkameen River, adjacent to the town of Princeton, 3.20 ha. 
Wolf Creek Indian Reserve No. 3, on the right bank of the Similkameen River at the mouth of Wolfe Creek, 9 miles east of Princeton, 202.50 ha.

See also
Okanagan people

References

Syilx governments
Similkameen Country